Saeed Zeinali (born 22 September 1976) is an Iranian student at Tehran University who was arrested on 10 July 1999, 5 days after the Iran student protests, July 1999. He was 23 years old.

Disappearance
He was imprisoned in the notorious Evin prison in Tehran at least until 2002. Three months after his arrest he was allowed to make a phone call to his family, but they have not heard about him since. Security forces and Evin prison officials refuse to publish any information about him.

Aftermath
On July 9, 2013, the anniversary of the event hold at Tehran University, Saeed Zeinali's mother Akram Neghabi said that a judiciary official has promised to help her.

On 2019, after 21 years, Amnesty International wanted to clarify the status of detained student Saeed Zeinali and wrote on its Twitter: "Two decades have passed since the forced disappearance of student activist Saeed Zinali. "Amnesty International stands by his suffering family to realize truth and justice."

See also 
List of people who disappeared

References 

1976 births
2000s missing person cases
Iranian activists
Iranian prisoners and detainees
Missing people
Missing person cases in Iran
University of Tehran alumni